Jamalabad (also Romanized as Jamālābād; also known as Jamlav and Sūlīng) is an Assyrian village in Anzal-e Shomali Rural District, Anzal District, Urmia County, West Azerbaijan Province, Iran. At the 2006 census, its population was 209, in 67 families.

References 

Populated places in Urmia County